Turci may refer to:

People
 Annalisa Turci (born 1976), Italian softball player 
 Luigi Turci (born 1970), Italian footballer
 Paola Turci (born 1964), Italian pop singer

Fungi
 Russula turci, a common, edible Russula mushroom

Italian-language surnames